Ottobock SE & Co. KGaA, formerly Otto Bock, is a company based in Duderstadt Germany, that operates in the field of orthopedic technology. It is considered the world market leader in the field of prosthetics and one of the leading suppliers in orthotics, wheelchairs and exoskeletons.

In 2019, the Ottobock Group as a whole generated sales of €1,002 million with 8,367 employees worldwide.

History

Foundation until 1945 
The company was founded on January 13, 1919 as Orthopädische Industrie GmbH by the entrepreneur Otto Bock in Berlin to supply prostheses and orthopedic products to the many thousands of war invalids of World War I. In 1920, production was relocated to Königsee in Thuringia, where up to 600 people worked at times. Since the high demand could hardly be met by handicraft methods, Otto Bock began to mass-produce prosthetic parts, thus laying the foundation for the orthopedic industry. New materials were used in production, so that aluminum parts were already being used in prosthetics in the 1930s. After graduating from high school in 1935, Max Näder began training as an orthopedic mechanic and industrial clerk at Ottobock. In 1943, during wartime leave, he married Marie Bock, the younger sister of the entrepreneur. During World War II, the company employed forced laborers.

1946-1989 
After World War II, when all the family's private assets as well as the factory in Königsee had been confiscated by the Soviet occupiers, the company settled in Duderstadt in southern Lower Saxony in 1946. In 1950, plastics were introduced into production for the first time. The invention of a braking knee joint with high stability, called the Jüpa knee, brought the economic breakthrough after 1949. Together with a newly developed balance device and two other apparatuses for prosthetic alignment, it was also in demand on the American market. In 1955, Ottobock exported the first 500 Jüpa knees to the U.S. The establishment of an American branch in Minneapolis in 1958 marked the beginning of the company's international sales structure.

In 1965, Max Näder introduced myoelectric arm prostheses to the market. For the first time, light and fragile as well as heavy objects could be grasped with them. In myoelectrics, weak electrical voltages control the prosthesis. Another development was a fitting solution for modular leg prostheses. The pyramid adapter, patented in 1969, connects the prosthetic foot, knee joint and stem and allows static corrections as well as the exchange of the modules. It remains an integrative element of innovative joints to this day.

1990 until today 

After reunification, Hans Georg Näder took over the management of the family company from his father Max Näder, the son-in-law of company founder Otto Bock, in 1990. In the same year, the company was able to reacquire the old Ottobock site in Königsee. Today, manual wheelchairs, power wheelchairs, rehabilitation products for children and seat shell bases are produced at the former headquarters.

After a five-year development period, the world's first microprocessor-controlled knee joint, the C-Leg, was presented at the World Prosthetics Congress in Nuremberg in 1997. The company's 90th anniversary was also marked by the launch of the C-Leg.

To mark the company's 90th anniversary, the newly built Science Center Medical Technology was inaugurated in Berlin in June 2009. Until 2019, this building near Potsdamer Platz served both as a venue for the public exhibition Begreifen, was uns bewegt, and as a venue for congresses and seminars. On January 1, 2009, the subsidiary Otto Bock Mobility Solutions GmbH based in Königsee emerged from HealthCare. At the end of 2011, the old logo with the original signature of Otto Bock was replaced by a new international logo.

With the further development of electronic knee joint components and mechatronic prosthetic feet, better individual fitting was made possible. In 2011, people were able to safely walk backwards, overcome obstacles, or climb stairs in alternating steps with a prosthesis for the first time.

In 2016, Ottobock was banned from operating in parts of Bosnia following an investigation by the Centre for Investigative Reporting that revealed the company was implicated in a scandal involving the misuse of public health funds in which prosthetic limb users were forced to buy Ottoboc's products.

In February 2017, Ottobock purchased the myoelectric arm or hand prostheses developed under the product name BeBionic from the British medical technology company Steeper. Since May 2017, the prostheses have been part of Ottobock's product range. In April 2017, Ottobock acquired Boston-based BionX Medical Technologies that manufactured a prosthetic foot and ankle product that utilises robotics technology. In June 2017, Swedish venture capitalist, EQT, took a 20 percent stake in Ottobock.

In 2018, Ottobock acquired a 51 percent stake in Pohlig GmbH, a medium-sized orthopedic company based in Traunstein, Bavaria, and one of the most important orthopedic technology companies in Germany. In the same year, Ottobock acquired complete ownership of the orthopedic specialist.

Following a series of acquisitions, Ottobock reported in 2019 that for the first time in its history the company's sales exceeded €1 billion.

In November 2019, the Federal Trade Commission (FTC) forced Ottobock to divest all assets that it acquired via its acquisition of industry competitor Freedom Innovations LLC that was initially completed in September 2017 for breaking competition laws, incurring a damage of €78.1 million to Ottobock.

In December 2019, the European Investment Bank (EIB) announced that it will provide up to €100 million to Ottobock to support the company's development of new products.

With a new generation of orthoses from 2018 from the company, sensor technology regulates the stance and swing phase of the leg throughout the gait cycle. This helps to achieve a nearly natural gait pattern. An exoskeleton, the first product of the new Ottobock Bionic Exoskeletons business unit, relieves the strain of overhead work.

Ottobock expanded its exoskeletons business after acquiring US-based exoskeleton startup SuitX, a spinoff from Berkeley Robotics and Human Engineering Laboratory, in November 2021.

In May 2020, an Ottobock subsidiary based in Russia was fined by Russian anti-monopoly authorities for suspected cartel collusion which gave Ottobock and its co-conspirators a monopoly over state tenders for prosthetics, worth 168.1 million Russian Roubles.

Corporate affairs

Ownership 
The largest shareholder of Ottobock SE & Co. KGaA is Näder Holding GmbH & Co. KG, which is headquartered in Duderstadt. It is 100 percent owned by the owner family Näder, the direct descendants of the company founder Otto Bock. A further 20 percent is held by the Swedish financial investor EQT.

Hans Georg Näder has publicly stated that he intends to float Ottobock via an initial public offering (IPO) scheduled for 2022, despite previously announcing the intention to take Ottobock public in 2015. In February 2022, the company delayed the IPO to September 2022. According to Reuters, Ottobock announced in May 2022 that it would not pursue the IPO due to market conditions, while company insiders claimed the company is unlikely to reach the target valuation of five to six billion euros.

Management 
The Board of Directors manages the business of Ottobock SE & Co. KGaA and determines the basic guidelines and strategic direction of the company. It consists of four non-executive directors and currently two of the four executive directors (CEO/CSO and CFO). The Chairman of the Board of Directors is Hans Georg Näder.

The company's Supervisory Board is European co-determined and consists of six shareholder representatives and four employee representatives. It monitors the activities of the board of directors. The supervisory board is chaired by Bernd Bohr, long-time head of the automotive division of the Bosch Group. Other members include Gesche Joost and Michael Kaschke.

The company employs four executive directors: Oliver Jakobi, chief executive officer (CEO) and chief revenue officer (CRO), Arne Kreitz, chief financial officer (CFO), Arne Jörn chief operating officer (COO) and chief technology officer (CTO) and Martin Böhm chief experience officer. Philipp Schulte-Noelle is a former senior executive of German healthcare public company Fresenius, who was appointed as the CEO of Ottobock in 2019 amid the plan to take Ottobock public. Kathrin Dahnke was hired by Ottobock in July 2021 after she left her position as CFO at German electric lights manufacturer Osram.

In May 2022, Kathrin Dahnke, Philipp Schulte-Noelle and Andreas Goppelt were ousted from the company following the intervention by Hans Georg Näder, who opposed with the plan to take the company public in 2022. Kathrin Dahnke told reporters just days before her departure that Ottobock still intends to go public.

Locations 
As of the end of 2019, Ottobock employed more than 8,000 people worldwide. In addition to the corporate headquarters in Duderstadt, Ottobock has other Germany-based locations in Königsee, Hanover, Traunstein and Berlin. A competence center and research and development workshop are located in Göttingen.

As of February 2022, the company operates a total of almost 60 sites in North and South America, Europe, Asia, Africa and Australia. Ottobock SE & Co. KGaA is the global market leader in technical orthopedics/prosthetics, with sales and service locations in more than 60 countries.

Paralympic Games 

Ottobock is an official international partner to the International Paralympic Committee (IPC) since 2005, and has been providing technical services at the Paralympic Games since 1988.

The 2016 Paralympic Games in Rio de Janeiro was the 13th games at which it provided technical services. This involved shipping  of equipment, including 15,000 spare parts, 1,100 wheelchair tyres, 70 running blades and 300 prosthetic feet,  from Duderstadt to the port at Bremerhaven,  by sea to Santos, and then  by road to Rio de Janeiro. At Seoul in 1988, four Ottobock technicians carried out 350 repairs;  in Rio de Janeiro in 2016, 100 technicians from 29 countries speaking 26 languages carried out 3,361 repairs for 1,162 athletes, including 2,745 repairs to wheelchairs, 438 to prosthetics, and 178 to orthotics.

In Rio on 10 September, the IPC's president, Sir Philip Craven, announced that Ottobock had agreed to extend its world-wide partnership to the end of 2020, encompassing the 2020 Paralympic Games in Tokyo.

References

External links

 

Companies based in Lower Saxony
Prosthetic manufacturers
Bionics
Medical technology companies of Germany
German brands
Assistive technology
Manufacturing companies established in 1919